Gregor Ocvirk (born 5 December 1998) is a Slovenian handball player who plays for RK Vojvodina and the Slovenia men's national handball team.

Career

Awards and accomplishments

Club

Individual
All-Star Team as best Left back at the 2018 Junior European Championship
Top scorer at the 2018 Junior European Championship (57 goals)

References

1998 births
Living people
Slovenian male handball players
Sportspeople from Celje
IFK Kristianstad players
21st-century Slovenian people